Raohe County is a county of far eastern Heilongjiang province, People's Republic of China, bordering Russia's Khabarovsk Krai and Primorsky Krai to the east. It is under the jurisdiction of the prefecture-level city of Shuangyashan.

Administrative divisions 
Raohe County is divided into 4 towns and 5 townships. 
4 towns
 Raohe, Xiaojiahe, Xifeng, Wulindong
5 townships
 Xilinzi, Sipai, Dajiahe, Shanli, Datonghe

Demographics 

Climate

Notes and references

External links
  Government site - 

Raohe
Shuangyashan